Wola Branicka-Kolonia  is a village in the administrative district of Gmina Zgierz, within Zgierz County, Łódź Voivodeship, in central Poland.

References

Wola Branicka-Kolonia